Romeral is a stratovolcano located in Caldas, Colombia. It is the northernmost Holocene volcano of South America, of the North Volcanic Zone in the Andean Volcanic Belt. The volcano was formed in the Late Pliocene, approximately 3 million years ago.

See also 
 List of volcanoes in Colombia
 List of volcanoes by elevation

References

Bibliography

External links 
 

Mountains of Colombia
Stratovolcanoes of Colombia
Andean Volcanic Belt
Pliocene stratovolcanoes
Neogene Colombia
Pleistocene stratovolcanoes
Pleistocene Colombia
Holocene stratovolcanoes
Holocene Colombia
Three-thousanders of the Andes
Geography of Caldas Department